See Superbank (surfing) for the surf spot on the Gold Coast, Australia.

Superbank was a joint-venture retail bank in New Zealand, operated by St George Bank in association with the New Zealand grocery-retailer Foodstuffs. Superbank operated between 2003 and 2006.

Superbank provided retail transaction banking. Superbank marketed its services through product-information leaflets at New World, Pak'n Save, and Four Square.  Actual banking took place through Internet and phone banking.

The company also provided mortgages via mobile lending managers and also mortgage brokers.

Launched in February 2003, Superbank lost $40m, having attracted only 2200 customers during the three-and-a-half years of its operation.  It was shut down on 26 September 2006.  All its home-loan business were sold to GE Money, while all savings customers were offered a transfer to Kiwibank.

References

External links
 Superbank 
 Foodstuffs Cooperative

Defunct banks of New Zealand
Banks established in 2003
2006 disestablishments in New Zealand
Banks disestablished in 2006
New Zealand companies established in 2003